Pickled ginger may refer to one of two types of ginger in Japanese cuisine:

Gari, sweet, thinly sliced young ginger that is light pink in color and served with sushi
Beni shōga, thin strips of red-colored ginger served with other dishes

See also
Ginger (disambiguation)